Hapoel Reineh was an Israeli football club based in Reineh.

History
The club played during most of its existence in the lower leagues of the Israeli football league system. In 1994 the club was promoted to Liga Bet, where it played for the next nine seasons, before winning the North B division and being promoted to fourth tier Liga Alef. The club played for four seasons in Liga Alef, finishing 8th, its best placing, in 2005–06. In 2004–05 the club qualified to the 9th round of the State Cup, where it met Hapoel Nahlat Yehuda and lost 0–1. In 2006–07 the club finished 13th and was relegated to Liga Bet. Shortly afterwards the club folded.

Honours

League

References

External links
 Hapoel Reineh  Israel Football Association

Reineh
Association football clubs disestablished in 2007
Reineh
2007 disestablishments in Israel